Adam Schusser (born April 18, 1991) is a Czech-German professional ice hockey defenceman who currently plays for 1. EV Weiden of the Oberliga.

Schusser previously played 26 games in the Czech Extraliga for HC Karlovy Vary. He also had loan spells with HC Most in the 1st Czech National Hockey League and HC Baník Sokolov in the Czech 2. liga before moving to Germany in 2015 with EHC Freiburg of DEL2.

Schusser joined EHV Schönheide 09 of the Oberliga on July 15, 2016. He then joined fellow Oberliga side 1. EV Weiden on June 2, 2017, following Schönheide's relegation to the Regionalliga.

References

External links

1991 births
Living people
HC Baník Sokolov players
Czech ice hockey defencemen
EHC Freiburg players
Naturalized citizens of Germany
HC Karlovy Vary players
HC Most players
Sportspeople from Karlovy Vary
1. EV Weiden players
Czech expatriate ice hockey players in Germany
Czech people of German descent